The Arkansas Diamonds were a professional American football team based in Little Rock, Arkansas. They began play in 1966 as an independent, semi-professional club until they joined the Continental Football League for its 1968 season. The COFL ceased operations after its 1969 season, and the Diamonds folded in March 1970.

Season-by-season

References

Continental Football League teams